is the eighth album by Mucc, released on March 26, 2008. It was released in the United States on November 25, 2008 and in the United Kingdom on October 13, 2008. The UK edition featured a live version "Libra" (which was previously released on the "Flight" single), and the video for "Fuzz". The album reached number 13 on the Oricon chart. The song "Fuzz" also appears in the American movie Cloverfield.

Track listing

Note
 A re-recording of "Fuzz" was featured on their 2017 self-cover album Koroshi no Shirabe II This is NOT Greatest Hits.
 A re-recording of "Nuritsubusunara Enji" was featured on their 2021 best album Myojo.

Covers 
"Flight" and "Libra" were covered by Breakerz and Junko Yano respectively, on the 2017 Mucc tribute album Tribute Of Mucc -en-.

Personnel 
Mucc
Tatsurou - vocals
Miya - guitar and chorus
Yukke - bass
Satochi - drums
Atsushi Koike - manipulation (tracks 8 & 12)
Sakura - percussion (tracks 3 & 8 )
Crusher Kimura - strings (track 8)
Shinji Asakura - percussion  (track 10)

References

Mucc albums
2008 albums